International Campus of Sharif University of Technology (Persian: پردیس بین الملل دانشگاه صنعتی شریف) was started on Kish Island in 2005 in cooperation with Kish University (affiliated to Kish Free Zone Organization).

History

Kish University started admitting students for associate courses in accountancy and bachelor's course in business administration from 1996 on Kish Island in Persian Gulf. After it was turned into a First Type institute in 1997, the university admitted students in bachelor's courses of accountancy, business administration, computer and English translation as well as master's courses in sea physics and metallurgy up to the end of the Iranian year 1383 (21 March 2005).

Thereafter, in line with policies adopted by Board of Trustees of the University and within the framework of university's seven-year strategy, an agreement was signed to transfer management of the institute to Sharif University of Technology.

After the cooperation began and according to an agreement signed between Kish Free Zone Organization and Sharif University of Technology, management of Kish University was to be transferred to Sharif University of Technology through a four-year transition period. At the end of the period, management of Kish University was officially transferred to Sharif University of Technology in 2009 as international campus of the university.

Academic profile

The campus is currently admitting students for bachelor's, master's and PhD degrees in technical and engineering courses and for a master's degree in management. Students are admitted through national entrance examination administered yearly by the Ministry of Science, Research and Technology. At present, the campus  has more than 1000 MSc, BSc, and more than 40 PhD students. All the courses in university classes are taught and examined in English.

Today there are two faculties active in this university: Faculty of Engineering and Science, and Faculty of Management.

The university also offers joint degree programs with Multimedia University in Malaysia.

Buildings

Central Building
Faculty of Engineering and Science Building
Laboratories and Workshops Building
Language Centre Building

See also

Sharif University of Technology
Higher education in Iran
Kish Island

External links
 Sharif University of Technology - International Campus
 Sharif University of Technology
 Kish Freezone Organization

Sharif University of Technology
Engineering universities and colleges in Iran
Educational institutions established in 2005
Kish Island
Education in Hormozgan Province
Buildings and structures in Hormozgan Province
2005 establishments in Iran